|}
William Carl Yan is an Australian politician from the Northern Territory.

Yan was employed at a correctional facility for 17 years. He joined the Country Liberal Party and ran as a candidate in the electoral division of Namatjira for the 2020 Northern Territory general election. He won the election by a margin of 22 votes, and is currently a member of the Northern Territory Legislative Assembly.

References

Living people
Members of the Northern Territory Legislative Assembly
Country Liberal Party members of the Northern Territory Legislative Assembly
21st-century Australian politicians
Year of birth missing (living people)